The 2022–23 High Point Panthers men's basketball team represented High Point University in the 2022–23 NCAA Division I men's basketball season. The Panthers, were led by 2nd-year head coach G. G. Smith, in his first full season after being named interim when his father, Tubby Smith resigned halfway through 2021–22 season. The Panthers played their home games at the Qubein Center in High Point, North Carolina as members of the Big South Conference.

Previous season
The Panthers finished the 2021–22 season 14–17, 7–9 in Big South play to finish in tied for third place in the North Division. In the Big South tournament, they defeated Hampton in the first round, before falling to Winthrop in the quarterfinals.

Offseason

Departures

Incoming transfers

Recruiting class

Roster

Schedule and results 

|-
!colspan=12 style=| Exhibition

|-
|-
!colspan=12 style=| Regular season

|-
!colspan=12 style=| Big South regular season

|-
!colspan=12 style=| Big South tournament

Sources

References 

High Point Panthers men's basketball seasons
High Point Panthers
High Point Panthers men's basketball
High Point Panthers men's basketball